Haplopappus foliosus is a species of flowering plant in the family Asteraceae that is endemic to Chile.

Description and ecology
The species is used for ornaments, the inflorescences of which are yellow in colour and have around 14 florets.

References

foliosus
Endemic flora of Chile
Plants described in 1836
Taxa named by Augustin Pyramus de Candolle